Adam (Aatu) Halme (4 December 1873 - 4 March 1933; surname until 1901 Möykkynen) was a Finnish construction worker, trade union functionary and politician, born in Nilsiä. He was a member of the Parliament of Finland from 1919 to 1922, representing the Social Democratic Party of Finland (SDP).

References

1873 births
1933 deaths
People from Nilsiä
People from Kuopio Province (Grand Duchy of Finland)
Social Democratic Party of Finland politicians
Members of the Parliament of Finland (1919–22)